Pomaro Monferrato is a comune (municipality) in the Province of Alessandria in the Italian region Piedmont, located about  east of Turin and about  north of Alessandria.

Pomaro Monferrato borders the following municipalities: Borgo San Martino, Bozzole, Giarole, Occimiano, Ticineto, Valenza, and Valmacca.

Main sights
Castle, now a private patrician residence
Palazzo del Corpo di Guardia (13th-14th centuries)
Parish church of Santa Sabina, in Gothic-Romanesque style

References

Cities and towns in Piedmont